Jeffrey D. Sharples (born July 28, 1967) is a Canadian former professional ice hockey defenceman who played 105 games in the National Hockey League (NHL) with the Detroit Red Wings.  He was a second round selection of the Red Wings, 29th overall, at the 1985 NHL Entry Draft and made his NHL debut late in the 1986–87 NHL season. Sharples was born in Terrace, British Columbia.

Sharples spent the majority of two seasons with the Red Wings until he was traded to the Edmonton Oilers on November 2, 1989.  He never appeared in a regular-season game with Edmonton; his only action with the team was in an exhibition game against the Soviet club team, Khimik Voskresensk. Sharples spent most of the 1989–90 AHL season with the Cape Breton Oilers before he was again traded, this time to the New Jersey Devils on March 6, 1990.  Sharples played ten more seasons in the minor leagues but never played in the NHL again.  He retired in 2000.

Career statistics

Awards
 WHL West Second All-Star Team – 1985

References

External links
 

1967 births
Canadian ice hockey defencemen
Cape Breton Oilers players
Detroit Red Wings draft picks
Detroit Red Wings players
Ice hockey people from British Columbia
Living people
People from Terrace, British Columbia
Kelowna Wings players
Portland Winterhawks players
Spokane Chiefs players
Utica Devils players
Capital District Islanders players
Adirondack Red Wings players
Kansas City Blades players
Las Vegas Thunder players
Utah Grizzlies (IHL) players
Canadian expatriate ice hockey players in the United States